The U.S. state of Georgia is divided into 159 counties, more than any other state except for Texas, which has 254 counties. In Georgia, county seats typically have a courthouse at a town square. Courthouses in Georgia have been replaced for a variety of reasons. Courthouses have typically been replaced over time due to natural wear on courthouses, being destroyed in the Civil War, or communities outgrowing their current courthouse. When county seats have been moved, a new courthouse was typically constructed. Courthouses in Georgia have also been destroyed by disasters including fire, tornadoes, war, and arson. The most recent county courthouse to suffer a disaster was the burning of Hancock County, Georgia's courthouse in August 2014.

History
The architectural style of courthouses in Georgia has varied over time and from region to region.

Antebellum
It was common for the first courthouse of a county on the frontier to be a log cabin type structure. Houses being repurposed for county courthouses was not an uncommon method for a county acquiring a courthouse. Courthouses often doubled as churches and schools before the 1900s. During Georgia's colonial period the area was subdivided into parishes. Some parishes did have the equivalent of county courthouses. No county courthouses in Georgia from the 1700s currently survive.

By the mid-1800s it became common for courthouses to still be made of wood, but out of wood that had been processed into boards instead of unhewed logs. The Old Marion County Courthouse in Tazewell, Georgia and the Old Chattahoochee County Courthouse are only two surviving wooden courthouses in Georgia. Neither are currently in use as a courthouse. County seats of areas with larger populations often built courthouses made out of bricks before counties from more rural areas. Vernacular architecture was a common style. Greek Revival was another common pre-Civil War architectural style for county courthouses.

American Civil War
During the American Civil War, twelve county courthouses were destroyed by Union troops. In June 1863, the courthouse of McIntosh County at Darien was destroyed by Union Troops along with most of the town. Dade County was destroyed in 1863 during the Chattanooga Campaign. Catoosa County's courthouse at Ringgold was saved from destruction by William Tecumseh Sherman when he learned it was also a Masonic lodge.

The courthouses of Cherokee County, Clayton County, Cobb County, Polk County, and Whitfield County were destroyed in 1864 during the Atlanta Campaign. The courthouses of Bulloch, Butts, Screven County, Washington County, and Wilkinson County were destroyed during Sherman's March to the Sea in 1864.

Reconstruction to the 1920s
By the late 1800s, brick courthouses were more common than they had been earlier in the century. Many courthouses were being constructed in styles more elaborate than the typical vernacular architecture, which had previously been common. Neoclassical, Italianate, and Romanesque were the most common architectural styles of county courthouses during the late 1800s. 
High Victorian Gothic and Second Empire were also common.

Works Progress Administration
During the 1930s, the Works Progress Administration assisted many county governments with building new courthouses and renovating older courthouses. Stripped Classicism and Colonial Revival were two of the more common styles during the 1930s.

Post-World War II courthouses

After World War II, Neoclassical architecture had been surpassed by Modern architecture as the top style for new courthouses. When modern architecture was not used as the style of a new courthouse, it was often due to an attempt to replicate the appearance of a previous. By the 1980s, many counties began to replace their historic courthouses with judicial complexes. Most offices would be transferred to the new building, but some would remain in the old courthouses.

Surviving original county courthouses
It is uncommon for counties to still have their original courthouse. The surviving county courthouses that were their county's first courthouse are:
Old Banks County Courthouse completed in 1863, no longer in use.
Brooks County Courthouse, completed in 1864.
McDuffie County Courthouse, completed in 1872.
Jeff Davis County Courthouse, completed in 1906.
Turner County Courthouse, completed in 1908.
Ben Hill County Courthouse, completed in 1909.
Tift County Courthouse, completed in 1913.
Bleckley County Courthouse, completed in 1914.
Bacon County Courthouse, completed in 1919.
Atkinson County Courthouse, completed in 1920.
Treutlen County Courthouse, completed in 1920.
Barrow County Courthouse, completed in 1920.
Candler County Courthouse, completed in 1921.
Evans County Courthouse, completed in 1923.
Long County Courthouse, completed in 1924.
Lamar County Courthouse, completed in 1931.
Peach County Courthouse, completed in 1936.

A county still having their previous county courthouse in existence is not uncommon. Many previous county courthouses have been repurposed as museums. It is rare for a county to have more than one previous county courthouse still in existence, or to have a courthouse still in existence other than the one immediately preceding their current one. The Old Bartow County Courthouse, 1869 Clayton County Courthouse, Floyd County Courthouse, and the Old Spalding County Courthouse are examples of such courthouses. The only surviving courthouse from a town that is not the current county seat is the Old Marion County Courthouse in Tazewell, Georgia.

Oldest courthouses
The ten oldest of Georgia's county courthouses still in existence are:
Old Government House Richmond County, Georgia, completed in 1801.
Columbia County Courthouse, completed 1812 with extensive additions made in 1856.
Putnam County Courthouse, completed in 1824.	
Fayette County Courthouse, completed in 1825.
Crawford County Courthouse, completed in 1832.
Lumpkin County Courthouse, completed in 1836.
Old Marion County Courthouse, in 1848.
Greene County Courthouse, completed in 1849.
Old Chattahoochee County Courthouse, completed in the early 1850s.
Burke County Courthouse completed in 1857.

The ten oldest of Georgia's county courthouses currently in use as courthouses are:
Putnam County Courthouse completed in 1824.
Greene County Courthouse completed in 1849.
Burke County Courthouse completed in 1857.
Thomas County Courthouse, completed in 1858.
Brooks County Courthouse, completed in 1864.
Washington County Courthouse, completed in 1869.
McDuffie County Courthouse, completed in 1872.
McIntosh County Courthouse, completed in 1873.
Jackson County Courthourse, completed in 1879.
Newton County Courthouse, completed in 1884.

County courthouse listing

See also
List of county seats in Georgia
List of United States federal courthouses in Georgia

References

External links
 GEORGIAINFO An Online Georgia Almanac created by GALILEO.
 Courthouse History A historical look at United States courthouses through postcards.

Georgia (U.S. state) geography-related lists

Courthouses, county
Georgia